Ponta II Cabinet was the Council of Ministers which governed Romania from 21 December 2012 to 5 March 2014. A crisis inside the ruling coalition, the Social Liberal Union (USL), resulted in the split of the governing alliance and collapse of the government.

History 
On 17 December 2012, after USL victory in the legislative elections of 9 December, President Traian Băsescu nominated Victor Ponta to form a new government, this being the only person proposed by the parliamentary parties. Ponta II Cabinet received the vote of confidence of the Parliament on 21 December, with 402 votes "for" and 120 "against".

Ponta II Cabinet was composed of three deputy prime ministers, 15 ministers and nine minister-delegates. The three deputy prime ministers were: Liviu Dragnea (PSD) – Minister of Administration and Regional Development, Daniel Chițoiu (PNL) – Minister of Finance and Gabriel Oprea (UNPR) – deputy prime minister without portfolio in the field of defense and national security.

Ponta II Cabinet was composed of 60 state secretaries (13 more than in Ponta I Cabinet) and 120 heads of agencies.

Controversies 
Minister Relu Fenechiu left on 12 July 2013 the Ministry of Transport, after he was handed a five-year prison sentence for corruption. The interim was taken by Prime Minister Victor Ponta. But, at its expiration, PNL was somehow obliged to submit a proposal to the Prime Minister for the position of Minister of Transport. There was conveyed the name of Nini Săpunaru, but after Ponta publicly opposed the proposal, PNL has submitted another name candidate to the ministry's seat – Ramona Mănescu. The Prime Minister accepted the proposal, and so, Ramona Mănescu took the oath on 26 August.

Another minister that submitted the resignation is Varujan Vosganian, responsible for Economy. This comes after the Directorate for Investigating Organized Crime and Terrorism asked the criminal prosecution against Vosganian, for gaff and undermining the national economy. Sources inside USL said that Vosganian resigned upon the request of Prime Minister Victor Ponta.

On 12 December 2013, Minister of Culture Daniel Barbu resigned after displaced statements on "too big" budget for prevention and control of HIV/AIDS. His declarations sparked public outrage, being sanctioned by the National Council for Combating Discrimination. A few days before, President of the Senate Crin Antonescu said that Barbu should resign.

2014 governmental crisis 
A major crisis is shaking the current government of Romania. It was triggered a few days after PNL, constituent party of government, announced the reshuffling of four ministers. Tensions between leaders of the two major parties of government, Victor Ponta (PSD) and Crin Antonescu (PNL), grew until 25 February, when PNL decided in an overwhelming majority to leave the ruling coalition. A day later, all PNL ministers resigned. This situation puts the current Prime Minister Victor Ponta in difficulty, inasmuch as he is forced to form a new government.

Structure

References 

Ponta II
2012 establishments in Romania
Cabinets established in 2012
Cabinets disestablished in 2014
2014 disestablishments in Romania